Gyrfalcon Lake is located in Glacier National Park, in the U. S. state of Montana. Gyrfalcon Lake is east of Two Ocean Glacier.

See also
List of lakes in Flathead County, Montana (A-L)

References

Lakes of Glacier National Park (U.S.)
Lakes of Flathead County, Montana